Fengcheng is a city in the southeast of Liaoning Province in Northeast China.

Formally known as the Fengcheng Manchu Autonomous County, its city status (a county-level city) was approved in 1994.

Administrative Divisions
There are three subdistricts, 18 town, and one ethnic township under the city's administration.

Subdistricts:
Fenghuangcheng Subdistrict, Fengshan Subdistrict, Caohe Subdistrict

Towns:
Qingchengzi, Tongyuanbao, Aiyang, Saima, Jiguanshan, Bianmen, Hongqi, Dixiongshan, Dabao, Dongtang, Liujiahe, Baoshan, Lanqi, Baiqi, Simenzi, Shicheng, Shalizhai, Daxing

The only township is Dabao Mongol Ethnic Township

Climate

Landmarks
 Fenghuang Mountain

References

External links

 
County-level divisions of Liaoning